The Karuma–Olwiyo–Pakwach–Nebbi–Arua Road is a road in the Northern Region of Uganda, connecting the towns of Karuma, Olwiyo, Pakwach, Nebbi and the city of Arua.

Location
However, the roadworks as contracted, measured .

Upgrading to bitumen
In 2001, the government of Uganda borrowed US$64.5 million (USh100 billion at that time), from the International Development Association, to upgrade this road to class II bitumen surface, with drainage channels, culverts and shoulders. The work was completed in sections, starting with the Arua–Nebbi section, which was completed in December 2003. The paved road continues to undergo periodic maintenance and rehabilitation.

Points of interest
 The section between Karuma and Olwiyo runs along the northern edge of Murchison Falls National Park.
 At Olwiyo, this road makes a T-junction with the Acholibur–Gulu–Olwiyo Road.
 The Pakwach Bridge on this road, is the fourth permanent bridge across River Nile in Uganda, the others being (1) the Source of the Nile Bridge (2) the Isimba Bridge and (3) the Karuma Bridge.

See also
 List of roads in Uganda
 Transport in Uganda
 Vurra–Arua–Koboko–Oraba Road

References

External links
 Uganda National Road Authority Homepage
 UNRA Promises A Better Road Network

Roads in Uganda
Kiryandongo District
Nwoya District
Nebbi District
Arua District
Northern Region, Uganda